The M102 engine family is a inline-four gasoline automobile engine family built by Mercedes-Benz in the 1980s and early 1990s. It is a relatively oversquare engine with a large bore and short stroke compared to the M115 engine which was used during the same timeframe.

M102.910
Used in the W201 190E 1.8 from 1990 onwards (badged as 180E in Australia from 1991 to 1993). Cubic capacity: . Power output: . Torque: 

Applications:
 1990-1993 W201 180E and 190E 1.8

M102.920
The M102.920 was a 2.0 L engine with an bore and stroke . Equipped with carburettor 175 CDT. Cubic capacity: . Power output: . Swedish and Swiss market models developed  at 5000 rpm thanks to their stricter emissions regulations.

Applications:
 1980-1986 W123 200
 1980-1986 W123 200T

M102.921
Similar to M102.920, but less power due to a different camshaft and different carburettor. Power Output: 

Applications:
 1983-1985 W201 190 (201.022)

M102.922
An update of the M102.920 engine for use in the W124 chassis, Cubic capacity: . Power output: . This change was applied across the board of all 2.0 and 2.3-litre M102 engines as part of running updates carried out between 1988 and 1990.

Applications:
 1985-1992 W124 200

M102.924
Similar to M102.921, different carburettor, single-belt drive for alternator, power steering pump and air-conditioning compressor (where fitted).  Hydraulic aided valvetrain. Power output: .

Application
 1986-1990 W201 190 (201.023)

M102.938
Low compression version of M102.921. Power output: .

Application 
 W201 190

M102.939
Low compression version of M102.920. Power output: .

Application 
 W123 200
 W123 200T

M102.961
A 2.0 L multi-point fuel-injected (KE-Jetronic) variation of the M102.921. An "E" was added to the model of the vehicle (standing for "einspritzung", the German word for fuel injection). This engine is identified by TSZ ignition and multiple belts for the alternator, power steering and air conditioning compressor (where fitted). Cubic capacity: . Power output: 

Application
 1983-1985 W201 190E
 1984 Apal Francochamps

M102.962
An update to the M102.961 introduced in 1985. This is identified by the EZL ignition system and a single accessory drive belt. Cubic capacity: . Power output: 87-90 kW (118-122 PS; 117-120 bhp)

Applications:
 1985-1993 W201 190E

M102.963
2.0–litre version with KE-Jetronic fuel injection. Cubic capacity: . Power output: 

Applications:
 1985-1992 W124 200E.

M102.964
2.0–litre version with KE-Jetronic fuel injection for the italian W460. Cubic capacity: . Power output: 

Applications:
 1986-1989 W460 200GE.

M102.980
The M102.980 was a 2.3 L version with a  bore and the same  stroke. Used K-Jetronic fuel injection. Cubic capacity: . Power output: 

Applications:
 1980-1986 W123 230E
 1980-1986 W123 230CE
 1980-1986 W123 230TE

M102.981
The M102.981 was a 2.3 L version with a  bore and the same  stroke. Cubic capacity: . Power output: 

Applications:
 1979-1989 W460 230GE Geländewagen

M102.982
Similar to the M102.980 version, but with the newer KE-Jetronic system from Bosch. Cubic capacity: . Power output: 

Applications:
 1985-1992 W124 230E
 1985-1992 W124 230CE
 1985-1992 W124 230TE

M102.983
A 16-valve version of the M102.985 with cylinder head designed by Cosworth.Cubic capacity: . Power output: ; USA: 

Applications:
 1986-1987 W201 190E 2.3-16
 1985-1989 Isdera Spyder 033i 2.3-16V

M102.985
An 8-valve M102 with a displacement of 2.3 L used in the W201 chassis with KE-Jetronic fuel injection. Cubic capacity: . Power output: 

Applications:
 1985-1992 W201 190 E 2.3

M102.990
An update of the 16-valve version with increased capacity (2.5 L) and stiffening ribs, still with a cylinder head designed by Cosworth. Cubic capacity: . Power output: 

Applications:
 1988-1993 W201 190E 2.5-16

M102.991
An update of the 2.5 16-valve version, with shorter stroke and larger bore. H beam rods and piston cooling jets. Cubic capacity: . Power output: 

Applications:
 1989 W201 190E 2.5-16 Evolution

M102.992
An update of the 102.991 version with removal of four crankshaft counterweights and even more stiffening ribs for higher RPMs. Single timing chain, oil pump with separate drive chain. Bigger Intake manifold, camshaft and exhaust system. Higher compression ratio 10,5:1. Cubic capacity: . Power output: 

Applications:
 1990 W201 190E 2.5-16 Evolution II

See also
 List of Mercedes-Benz engines

References

M102
Gasoline engines by model
Straight-four engines